Safwan Hawsawi   (born 23 April 1992) is a Saudi football player who currently plays as a defender .

References
 

1992 births
Living people
Saudi Arabian footballers
Al-Wehda Club (Mecca) players
Louletano D.C. players
Al-Taawoun FC players
Hajer FC players
Al-Ain FC (Saudi Arabia) players
Al-Nojoom FC players
Al-Lewaa Club players
Expatriate footballers in Portugal
Saudi Arabian expatriate sportspeople in Portugal
Saudi Arabian expatriate footballers
Saudi First Division League players
Saudi Professional League players
Saudi Second Division players
Association football defenders